This list of primary and secondary schools in Ilagan is sorted per district under its own separate schools division. It includes both public and private from primary to secondary that are duly recognized and accredited by the Department of Education and the Commission on Higher Education.

Schools in Ilagan City were originally grouped into three (3) districts, namely: Ilagan East District, Ilagan South District and Ilagan West District under the Division of Isabela. Under its current arrangement, the schools are now grouped into six (6) districts, namely: Ilagan North District, Ilagan Northwest District, Ilagan East District, Ilagan South District, Ilagan West District and San Antonio District.

As checked on the list of schools on Basic Education Information System (BEIS) of the DepEd, there are a total of 138 listed schools in the city.

Schools division heads
The first appointed schools division head in 2013 was Dr. Denizon P. Domingo. Its current administration is headed by Dr. Gilbert N. Tong, as the schools division superintendent for this division since 2019.

Elementary schools

Public elementary schools

West District
 Alibagu Elementary School
 Baligatan Elementary School
 Bliss Elementary School
 Camunatan Primary School
 Guinatan Primary School
 Ilagan West Central School
 Malalam Elementary School
 Namnama Elementary School
 Salindingan Elementary School
 San Felipe Elementary School
 Sto. Tomas Primary School

San Antonio District
 Baribad Elementary School
 Cabeceria 3 Elementary School
 Cabeceria 6 Elementary School
 Cabeceria 19 Elementary School
 Cabeceria 23 Elementary School
 Cabeceria 24 Elementary School
 Calindayagan Elementary School
 Capugotan Elementary School
 Dappat Integrated School
 Gayong-Gayong Norte Elementary School
 Gayong-Gayong Sur Integrated School
 Nangalisan Elementary School
 Sablang Elementary School
 San Antonio Elementary School
 San Manuel Elementary School
 San Pedro Elementary School
 San Rafael Elementary School
 Sindun Maride Elementary School
 Sta. Maria Elementary School

North District
 Balla Primary School
 Bangag Primary School
 Capellan Elementary School
 Capo Primary School
 Fuyo Elementary School
 Manaring Integrated School
 Minabang Elementary School
 Morado Elementary School
 Nanaguan Primary School
 Pasa Elementary School
 Rang-ayan Elementary School
 San Juan-Rugao Elementary School
 San Lorenzo Integrated School
 San Pablo-Quimalabasa Primary School
 San Rodrigo Primary School
 Sta. Catalina Elementary School
 Sta. Victoria Elementary School
 Tangcul-San Isidro Elementary School

North West District
 Arusip Elementary School
 Bagong Silang Elementary School
 Bigao Elementary School
 Cabannungan 1st Elementary School
 Cabannungan 2nd Elementary School
 Carikkikan Elementary School
 Lullutan Elementary School
 Malasin Elementary School
 Naguillian Baculud Elementary School
 Mangcuram Elementary School
 Pilar Elementary School
 San Ignacio Elementary School
 Siffu Elementary School
 Sta. Isabel Norte Elementary School
 Sta. Isabel Sur Elementary School
 Tubo Elementary School

East District
 Alinguigan 1st Elementary School
 Alinguigan 2nd Elementary School
 Alinguigan 3rd Elementary School
 Bagumbayan Elementary School (formerly Ilagan North Central School)
 Ilagan East Integrated SPED Center
 Marana 1st Elementary School
 Marana 2nd Elementary School
 Marana 3rd Elementary School
 San Andres Elementary School
 Sipay Elementary School

South District
 Aggassian Elementary School
 Ballacong Elementary School
 Batong Labang Elementary School
 Cabeceria 25 Elementary School
 Cebeceria 27 Elementary School
 Cadu Elementary School
 Casilagan Elementary School
 Fugu Elementary School
 Ilagan South Central School
 Lupigue Elementary School
 Sindun Bayabo Elementary School
 Sindun Highway Elementary School
 Talaytay Primary School
 Villa Imelda Primary School

Private elementary schools
 Advance Christian Academy of Ilagan
 Casa del Niño Montessori School of Ilagan - Elementary Department
 Chung Hua Institute
 Isabela Unified School
 Leap Ahead School of Learning
 Miracle Light Christian Academy - Elementary Department
 Montessori Education Center of Asia Pacific at Ilagan
 Saint Ferdinand College - Elementary Department
 The United Methodist Church - Pre-school & Elementary
 The Wesleyan Church

Secondary schools

Public high schools

West District
 Alibagu National High School
 Ilagan Sports High School
 Isabela National High School

North West District
 Ilagan West National High School
 Isabela School of Arts and Trades Cabannungan Annex
 Sta. Isabel National High School

San Antonio District
 Dappat Integrated School
 Gayong Gayong Sur Integrated School
 San Antonio National Agro-Industrial Vocational High School
 San Pedro National High School
 San Rafael National Vocational High School

North District
 Manaring Integrated School
 Rang-ayan National High School
 San Lorenzo Integrated School

South District
 Isabela School of Arts and Trades
 Lupigue Integrated School

Private high schools
 Casa del Niño Montessori School of Ilagan (Junior and Senior High School)
 Central Isabela Christian Academy
 Miracle Light Christian Academy - High School Department
 Saint Ferdinand College - Junior and Senior High School Department

SPED Centers
 Ilagan East Integrated SPED Center
 Ilagan South SPED Center

References

 
Ilagan
Ilagan